The 6abc Dunkin' Thanksgiving Day Parade is an annual Thanksgiving Day parade held in Philadelphia, Pennsylvania, and is presently sponsored and aired by ABC owned-and-operated television station WPVI-TV, through a co-sponsorship agreement with restaurant chain Dunkin'. It is currently the oldest Thanksgiving parade in the United States, having been held through the Great Depression & World War II, and was created by Gimbels department store in 1920. The Gimbels Thanksgiving Day Parade was held until the department store closed operations in 1986.

Following Gimbels closure, it would be known as the 6abc Dunkin' Donuts Thanksgiving Day Parade, 6abc IKEA Thanksgiving Day Parade, 6abc Boscov's Thanksgiving Day Parade, Channel 6 Mellon PSFS Thanksgiving Day Parade, and the Channel 6 MasterCard Thanksgiving Day Parade.

History
The Philadelphia parade first started in 1920 and is considered the oldest Thanksgiving Day parade in the country. Like other parades of its type, it features balloons, floats, high school marching bands, and celebrities. The Gimbels department store sponsored the 1920 parade as the Gimbels Thanksgiving Day Parade; it continued annually despite World War II. Ellis Gimbel, one of the founders of Gimbels Department Stores, wanted his toy land to be the destination of holiday shoppers everywhere. He had more than 50 store employees dressed in costume and sent to walk in their first Thanksgiving Day parade. The parade featured floats as marchers paraded down Market Street, with the finale consisting of Santa Claus arriving at the eighth-floor toy department at Gimbels by climbing the ladder of a Philadelphia Fire Department ladder truck. Gimbels emulated other holiday parades already in existence. The Santa Claus Parade in Peoria, Illinois, is held on the day after Thanksgiving and is the oldest, continuously held holiday parade in the country since 1887, under the sponsorship of Frederick Block and the Schipper & Block (later Block & Kuhl) Department Store. Block's example led to the founding of similar parades in other cities. The parade tradition continues today.

End of Gimbels Era

When BATUS Inc. was unable to find a buyer for Gimbels in 1986, the department store chain liquidated; the fate of the country's oldest parade was up in the air. Boscov's (a family-owned department store based in Reading, Pennsylvania) and WPVI (self-named "6abc" in its programs and promotions) therefore took over sponsorship.  They renamed the event as the 6abc Boscov's Thanksgiving Day Parade. 6abc is an owned-and-operated television station of the Walt Disney Company-owned American Broadcasting Company (since 1996), and thus, this parade benefits from access to Disney characters and personalities.

In 2004, the parade celebrated its 85th anniversary with new balloons and floats. An opening number paid tribute to the celebrities who had participated during its history. In 2005, it had the most stars in history, as well as eight new balloons, more than ever before. In 2007, the parade presented the first parade float with a built-in ice rink. Disney's High School Musical: The Ice Tour utilized the rink (WPVI and High School Musical are both owned by Disney).

In August 2008, Boscov's Department Stores filed for Chapter 11 bankruptcy protection and planned to close several stores, due to financial problems from the widespread recession. They then gave up sponsorship of the parade. Swedish furniture manufacturer IKEA, which has a store and its North American home office in nearby Conshohocken, Pennsylvania, succeeded Boscov's as parade sponsor from that year until 2010.

In June 2011, Dunkin' Donuts announced that they would sponsor the parade. In addition to balloons and marching bands, the show features ABC Network celebrities, stars from stage and screen, Disney characters, and local personalities, including members of the Action News team.

In 2020, the city of Philadelphia cancelled all public gatherings through January 2021, including the 6abc Thanksgiving Day Parade, due to the COVID-19 pandemic. This marked the first cancellation in the parade's history. In its stead was the 6abc Dunkin' Thanksgiving Celebration, a televised concert with modifications similar to those made by the Macy's and America's Thanksgiving Parades.

Television coverage
Since 1966, the parade has been broadcast on WPVI, as well as simulcast on other television stations throughout the United States. Viewers worldwide could also watch the telecast on the station's website, 6abc.com. Good Morning America, ABC's national morning news program, sends a reporter to the event each year and covers festivities leading up to the parade. Recently, Good Morning America then-weather anchor Sam Champion participated in hosting, marking his 6th year of participation in 2013. In more recent years, current GMA weekday weather anchor Ginger Zee has participated in hosting.

Jim O'Brien was the program's first host; Dave Roberts became a perennial host upon joining the station in 1978. After the sudden death of O'Brien in 1983, WPVI's Lisa Thomas-Laury "took the reins" as Roberts's co-host. Together, Roberts and Thomas-Laury hosted the parade for nearly 20 years. When Thomas-Laury began to experience health problems in 2002, WPVI weather anchor Cecily Tynan replaced her. 2006 marked the program's first high-definition telecast.

Since her return to WPVI, Thomas-Laury helped host the finale in 2005 and 2006. In 2009, the station announced that Roberts would retire from broadcasting on December 11 of that year. Thomas-Laury made a special appearance in 2009 to celebrate Roberts's years as host. The current hosting team is Tynan and WPVI news anchor Rick Williams, who replaced Roberts.

Along with Tynan and Williams, Action News weather anchor Karen Rogers reports from the sidelines during the event. Rogers (along with Williams and Tynan) also hosts the annual countdown from 8:30 am to 9:00 am (usually shown exclusively in Philadelphia). Along with Rogers, fellow weather anchor Adam Joseph travels the route on a golf cart to give viewers a glimpse of the parade as it goes down the Benjamin Franklin Parkway. He also hosts the "Parade Fan Cam" segment, where viewers can log on to the station's website and see all of the people who line the Parkway as well. Some of the people end up featured on the actual broadcast of the parade. In 2014, Alicia Vitarelli took over Joseph's role on the route and as the host of the "Parade Fan Cam." Starting in 2017, both Joseph and Vitarelli were co-hosts of the Fan Cam.

WPVI also broadcasts annual live coverage of Philadelphia's Pulaski, Columbus and Puerto Rican parades.

Balloons
Balloons have been created to represent a wide variety of characters from popular children's books, including folk tales; toys, comic books, animated movies (cartoons), TV series (such as Sesame Street), films and other genres. Increasingly over the years, the balloons have featured characters who have tie-in marketing of toys, games, and accessories.

Stars, performers, and acts 
In addition to the well-known balloons and floats, the parade also features live music and other performances. High-school marching bands from across the country participate, and the television broadcasts feature performances by famous singers and bands as well as appearances by local celebrities. The Rancocas Valley regional high school dance team danced there for the last three years and will continue to this year. Since 1997, the parade has also featured a tap routine called "FanTAPulous," with more than 450 dancers from the East Coast. Other special guests include state and national beauty contest winners, cheerleaders of major sports teams, casts from musicals performing in Philadelphia, and Santa and Mrs. Claus. Christie Rampone, Nicole Barenthart, Carli Lloyd and Heather O'Rielly from the gold medal-winning US women's national soccer team will also there. One featured group is the 7-Ups show choir from Bucktown, Pennsylvania. They are a school-run show choir that performs along the East Coast from Philadelphia down to Washington, DC.

Marching Bands

6abc Dunkin' Donuts Holiday Food Drive
For more than 25 years, WPVI-TV has partnered with the Boy Scouts of America Cradle of Liberty Council in their Scouting For Food program to collectively coordinate one of the most massive food drives in the nation. (In recent years, until 2006, it was called the 6abc/Boy Scouts Holiday Food Drive). In 2006 the Holiday Food Drive amassed 120,000 lbs of food, and for 2010 Boy Scouts troops' efforts led to the collection of over 40,000 pounds of food towards the cumulative total.  The food drive distributes paper bags to residents' homes and collection boxes at local stores in the region. A few weeks later, they are picked up and sent to help those in need at Thanksgiving and the end of year holidays. The Boy Scouts also go to the parade route every year and collect food from spectators. The parade and food drive sponsors are generally the same.  In June 2011, Dunkin' Donuts announced that they would also co-sponsor the food drive. Proceeds of the food drive currently benefit Philabundance.

See also

Mummers Parade
Wawa Welcome America
Santa Claus parades
List of Christmas and holiday season parades

References

External links
Official 2016 website
Official 2015 website
Official 2014 website
Official 2013 website
Official 2012 website
Official 2011 website

Thanksgiving Day Parade
Dunkin' Donuts Thanksgiving Day Parade
Thanksgiving Day Parade
Thanksgiving Day Parade
1920 establishments in Pennsylvania
Thanksgiving Day Parade
Thanksgiving Day Parade